Start symbol may refer to:
Start symbol (formal languages), the symbol in formal grammar from which rewriting of a string begins
_start symbol specifying an entry point in some formats of computer executables
▶️, a symbol used in media controls to start playing the media
Start of Heading or Start of Text symbols in C0 and C1 control codes

See also
Start button in Microsoft Windows